Aethes is a genus of moths belonging to the subfamily Tortricinae of the family Tortricidae.

Species
Aethes acerba Y.H. Sun & H.H. Li, 2013
Aethes affinis Razowski, 1967
Aethes afghana Razowski, 1983
Aethes alatavica (Danilevsky, in Danilevsky, Kuznetsov & Falkovitsh, 1962)
Aethes albogrisea Razowski & Wojtusiak, 2009
Aethes alphitopa (Clarke, 1968)
Aethes amseli Razowski, 1967
Aethes amurensis Razowski, 1964
Aethes angulatana (Robinson, 1869)
Aethes angustana (Clemens, 1860)
Aethes annosa Razowski, 1967
Aethes ardezana (Muller-Rutz, 1922)
Aethes argentilimitana (Robinson, 1869)
Aethes argyrospila Karisch, 2005
Aethes atlasi (Razowski, 1962)
Aethes atmospila (Meyrick in Caradja & Meyrick, 1937)
Aethes atomosana (Busck, 1907)
Aethes aurofasciana (Mann, 1855)
Aethes austera Razowski, 1967
Aethes baloghi Sabourin & Metzler, in Sabourin, Miller, Metzler & Vargo, 2002
Aethes beatricella (Walsingham, 1898)
Aethes bicuspis Razowski & Becker, 2002
Aethes bilbaensis (Rssler, 1877)
Aethes biscana (Kearfott, 1907)
Aethes bistigmatus Byun & Li, 2006
Aethes bomonana (Kearfott, 1907)
Aethes capnospila (Amsel, 1959)
Aethes caucasia (Amsel, 1959)
Aethes chilesi  Razowski & Wojtusiak, 2008
Aethes cinereoviridana (Kennel, 1899)
Aethes citreoflava Kuznetzov, 1966
Aethes cnicana (Westwood, in Wood, 1854)
Aethes confinis Razowski, 1974
Aethes conomochla (Meyrick, 1933)
Aethes conversana (Walsingham, 1907)
Aethes cremonana (Ragonot, 1894)
Aethes deaurana (Peyerimhoff, 1877)
Aethes decens Razowski, 1970
Aethes decimana ([Denis & Schiffermuller], 1775)
Aethes delotypa Razowski, 1970
Aethes dentifera Razowski, 1967
Aethes destituta Razowski, 1983
Aethes deutschiana (Zetterstedt, 1839)
Aethes dilucidana (Stephens, 1852)
Aethes eichleri Razowski, 1983
Aethes elpidia Razowski, 1983
Aethes evanida Razowski & Becker, 1983
Aethes fennicana (Hering, 1924)
Aethes fernaldana (Walsingham, 1879)
Aethes ferruginea (Walsingham, 1900)
Aethes flagellana (Duponchel, in Godart, 1836)
Aethes flava (Kuznetzov, 1970)
Aethes floccosana (Walker, 1863)
Aethes francillana (Fabricius, 1794)
Aethes furvescens Bai Guo & Guo, 1996
Aethes geniculata (Meyrick, 1930)
Aethes grandaeva Razowski & Becker, 1983
Aethes hartmanniana (Clerck, 1759)
Aethes heleniana Razowski, 1997
Aethes hoenei Razowski, 1964
Aethes ignobilis Razowski, 1994
Aethes inexpecta Razowski, 1967
Aethes intactana (Walsingham, 1879)
Aethes interruptofasciata (Robinson, 1869)
Aethes iranica Razowski, 1963
Aethes jonesi Razowski, 1967
Aethes kandovana Alipanah, 2009
Aethes kasyi Razowski, 1962
Aethes kindermanniana (Treitschke, 1830)
Aethes kyrkii Itämies & Mutanen, in Itämies, Mutanen & Lankinen, 2003
Aethes labonita Razowski & Wojtusiak, 2013
Aethes languidana (Mann, 1855)
Aethes lateritia Razowski, 1970
Aethes louisiana (Busck, 1907)
Aethes luteopictana (Kennel, 1900)
Aethes lygrana Karisch, 1992
Aethes macasiana Razowski & Pelz, 2001
Aethes margaritana (Haworth, [1811])
Aethes margaritifera Falkovitsh, 1963
Aethes margarotana (Duponchel, in Godart, 1836)
Aethes matheri Sabourin & Miller, in Sabourin, Miller, Metzler & Vargo, 2002
Aethes matthewcruzi Sabourin & Vargo, in Sabourin, Miller, Metzler & Vargo, 2002
Aethes mauritanica (Walsingham, 1898)
Aethes mesomelana (Walker, 1863)
Aethes mirifica Razowski & Becker, 1983
Aethes monera Razowski, 1986
Aethes mordax (Meyrick, 1917)
Aethes moribundana (Staudinger, 1859)
Aethes munda Karisch, 2003
Aethes mymara Razowski, 1997
Aethes nefandana (Kennel, 1899)
Aethes obliquana (Kearfott, 1907)
Aethes obscurana (Caradja, 1916)
Aethes olibra Razowski, 1994
Aethes pamirana (Razowski, 1967)
Aethes pannosana (Kennel, 1913)
Aethes pardaliana (Kennel, 1899)
Aethes patricia Metzler, 2000
Aethes pemeantensis Gibeaux, 1985
Aethes perfidana (Kennel, 1901)
Aethes persica Razowski, 1963
Aethes piercei Obraztsov, 1952
Aethes pinara Razowski & Becker, 2007
Aethes planaltinae Razowski & Becker, 1983
Aethes portentosa Razowski & Becker, 1983
Aethes prangana (Kennel, 1900)
Aethes promptana (Robinson, 1869)
Aethes rana (Busck, 1907)
Aethes razowskii Sabourin & Miller, in Sabourin, Miller, Metzler & Vargo, 2002 – Razowski's aethes moth
Aethes rectilineana (Caradja, 1939)
Aethes rubigana (Treitschke, 1830)
Aethes rubiginana (Walsingham, 1903)
Aethes rutilana (Hubner, [1814-1817])
Aethes sanguinana (Treitschke, 1830)
Aethes scalana (Zerny, 1927)
Aethes semicircularis Y.H. Sun & H.H. Li, 2013
Aethes seriatana (Zeller, 1875) – seriated aethes moth
Aethes sexdentata Sabourin & Miller, in Sabourin, Miller, Metzler & Vargo, 2002
Aethes shakibai Huemer & Wieser, 2004
Aethes smeathmanniana (Fabricius, 1781) – Smeathmann's aethes moth
Aethes sonorae (Walsingham, 1884) – streaked aethes moth
Aethes spartinana (Barnes & McDunnough, 1916)
Aethes spirana (Kennel, 1899)
Aethes subcitreoflava Y.H. Sun & H.H. Li, 2013
Aethes sulphurosana (Kennel, 1901)
Aethes taiwanica (Razowski, 1977)
Aethes terriae Sabourin & Miller, in Sabourin, Miller, Metzler & Vargo, 2002
Aethes tesserana ([Denis & Schiffermuller], 1775)
Aethes tornella Walsingham, 1898
Aethes triangulana (Treitschke, 1835)
Aethes turialba (Busck, 1920)
Aethes tuxtlana Razowski, 1986
Aethes vachelliana (Kearfott, 1907)
Aethes vicinana (Mann, 1859)
Aethes westratei Sabourin & Miller, in Sabourin, Miller, Metzler & Vargo, 2002
Aethes williana (Brahm, 1791)
Aethes xanthina Falkovitsh, 1963

See also
List of Tortricidae genera

References

 , 2009: Synopsis of the Cochylini (Tortricidae: Tortricinae: Cochylini) of Iran, with the description of a new species. Zootaxa 2245: 1-31.
 , 1820, Enum. Insect.: 90.
 , 2005: World catalogue of insects volume 5 Tortricidae.
 , 1986: List of Neotropical Aethes Billb. and Aethesoides Raz. (Lepidoptera, Tortricidae), with descriptions of new species. Annales Zoologici, Polska Akademia Nauk. 40(7): 387–396.
 , 2011: Diagnoses and remarks on genera of Tortricidae, 2: Cochylini (Lepidoptera: Tortricidae). Shilap Revista de Lepidopterologia 39 (156): 397–414.
 , 2002: Systematic and faunistic data on Neotropical Cochylini (Lepidoptera: Tortricidae), with descriptions of new species. Part.1. Acta zool. cracov. 45: 287-316  
 , 2009: Tortricidae (Lepidoptera) from the mountains of Ecuador and remarks on their geographical distribution. Part IV. Eastern Cordillera. Acta Zoologica Cracoviensia 51B (1–2): 119–187. doi:10.3409/azc.52b_1-2.119–187. Full article: .
 , 2013: Accessions to the fauna of Neotropical Tortricidae (Lepidoptera). Acta Zoologica Cracoviensia, 56 (1): 9-40. Full article: .
 , 2002: Revised identities and new species of Aethes from Midwestern North America (Tortricidae). The Journal of the Lepidopterists' Society 156 (4): 216–233. Full article: .
 , 2013: Three new species of Aethes Billberg, 1820 (Lepidoptera: Tortricidae: Cochylini), with a list of the species from China. Zootaxa 3669 (4): 456–468. Abstract:

External links

tortricidae.com

 
Cochylini
Tortricidae genera